Stephen Schneider  or Steve Schneider may refer to:
 Stephen Schneider (actor) (born 1980), American actor
 Stephen Schneider (scientist) (1945–2010), American climate scientist
 Steve Schneider (American football), American college football coach and athletic director
 Steve Schneider (Branch Davidian), second-in-command of the Branch Davidians
 Steve Schneider (computer scientist), English computer scientist